Luteone is a prenylated isoflavone, a type of flavonoid. It can be found in the pods of Laburnum anagyroides and can be synthesized.

References 

Isoflavones
Prenylflavonoids
Resorcinols